Doron Gazit (born 1953) is an Israeli environmental artist, activist and industrial designer recognized for his large-scale outdoor environmental art installations.

Gazit studied industrial design in Bezalel College in Jerusalem where he supported himself as a street balloon artist.

Red Line Project 

Gazit is documenting ecological devastations at locations affected by climate change in his temporary art installation named, Red Line Project. Doron Gazit is quoted saying, "Red Line Project was created as a metaphor for the blood vein of Mother Nature, alerting observers to the urgent need to remedy and protect our endangered environment. The vein turns into a 3D line, while the devastated landscapes are my largescale canvas."

Gazit's Red Line Project has been installed in the sinkholes of the Dead Sea in Israel, melting Knik Glaciar in Alaska, the Great Salt Lake in Utah, and the Salton Sea in California. He has planned future installations along the Amazon river, the forests of the Sumatra and Borneo, and the floating islands of garbage in the oceans.

Environmental artworks

Between 1996 and 2016 Gazit produced interactive art installations titled “Sculpting the Wind“ and “Visualizing the Invisible” in which he conceptually visualizes a dialogue between the sun and the wind using balloons and involving the participation of many people in multiple locations. As quoted by Gazit: "The wind fills the tubes with air, imprinting its motions on the tube from inside, and guiding its way forward - creating a dialog with mother nature - a conversation with the wind, the sun and the earth beneath them." His settings are meant to reference the anthropocene – mankind’s interface with nature, technology, and industry.

Gazit's works are considered site specific art.

AirChitecture and Air Dimensional Design

Air Dimensional Design was founded by Doron Gazit. Gazit was invited to decorate nine different venues for the 1984 Olympic Games in Los Angeles. He used polyethylene AirTubes as temporary architecture which Gazit calls AirChitecture. Gazit is credited as a co-inventor of the dancing inflatable which was developed for the 1996 Olympic Games in Atlanta.,

Gallery

References

Balloon artists
1953 births
Bezalel Academy of Arts and Design alumni
Living people